DundeeWealth Inc. was a Canadian financial services company, formerly a public company and subsidiary of Dundee Corporation.

DundeeWealth Inc. and its advisor network were acquired by Scotiabank on February 1, 2011. DundeeWealth Inc. has been renamed HollisWealth Inc. and effective November 1, 2013, HollisWealth replaced DundeeWealth as the brand name used by Scotiabank to identify one of Canada's largest independent financial advisor networks. The name HollisWealth is derived from the location of Scotiabank's historic head office building which was constructed more than 175 years ago, in 1837, at 188 Hollis Street in Halifax, Nova Scotia.
In 2017, iA Financial Group acquired HollisWealth from Scotiabank and merged its Investment Industry Regulatory Organization of Canada-regulated arm with iA Securities and it's Mutual Fund Dealers Association of Canada-regulated arm with Investia Financial Services Inc. Post-merger, HollisWealth advisor teams continued to use the HollisWealth brand.

Subsidiaries
 Brokerage
 DWM Securities Inc.
 Dundee Private Investors Inc.
 Dundee Insurance Agency Ltd.
 Dundee Mortgage Services Inc.
 Investment Management
 GCIC Ltd.
 Dynamic Funds
 DundeeWealth Investment Counsel (formerly Goodman Private Wealth Management)

Brokerage
DundeeWealth's brokerage business was made up of DWM Securities Inc., Dundee Private Investors Inc., Dundee Insurance Agency Ltd., and Dundee Mortgages Services Inc.

These operations included a full service investment dealer engaged in wealth management & financial advisory services, retail brokerage, financial planning, mutual fund dealership, a full service Managing General Agency (Insurance), and Mortgage services.

Investment management
DundeeWealth's investment management business was run by GCIC Ltd., whose Dynamic Funds division is perhaps the more commonly known business in DundeeWealth's investment management business.

Dynamic Funds is a mutual fund company, competing with the likes of Fidelity, Invesco Trimark, AIC, CI Funds, and many others. See the mutual fund companies in Canada page for more information.

References

External links
 Official website

Banks of Canada
Mutual fund companies of Canada
Stock brokerages and investment banks of Canada
2011 mergers and acquisitions